Sarah S. Vance (born January 16, 1950) is a United States district judge of the United States District Court for the Eastern District of Louisiana.

Education and career

Born in Donaldsonville, Louisiana, Vance received a Bachelor of Arts degree from Louisiana State University in 1971 and a Juris Doctor from Tulane University Law School in 1978. She was in private practice in New Orleans, Louisiana from 1978 to 1994.

Federal judicial service

On June 8, 1994, Vance was nominated by President Bill Clinton to a seat on the United States District Court for the Eastern District of Louisiana vacated by Henry Mentz. Vance was confirmed by the United States Senate on September 28, 1994, and received her commission on September 29, 1994. She served as chief judge from 2008 to 2015. She was appointed to the chair of the Judicial Panel on Multidistrict Litigation in 2014, becoming the first woman to hold the position.

Other service

In May 1996, Vance was elected to the American Law Institute. She served as an Adviser on ALI's Recognition & Enforcement of Foreign Judgments project and now serves as an Adviser on the Principles of the Law of Liability Insurance project. In May 2013, Vance was elected to a five-year term on the ALI Council.

References

Sources

1950 births
Living people
Louisiana State University alumni
Tulane University Law School alumni
Judges of the United States District Court for the Eastern District of Louisiana
United States district court judges appointed by Bill Clinton
People from Donaldsonville, Louisiana
20th-century American judges
21st-century American judges
20th-century American women judges
21st-century American women judges